Lilyfield is a suburb in the Inner West of Sydney, in the state of New South Wales, Australia. Lilyfield is located 6 kilometres west of the Sydney central business district, in the local government area of the Inner West Council.

Lilyfield is nestled in between the suburbs of Annandale, Rozelle and Leichhardt and is bounded to the west by Iron Cove. Originally a working-class area, today Lilyfield like many inner-city suburbs is becoming increasingly gentrified. Property investors, eager to capitalise on the suburb's proximity to the Sydney CBD, have purchased many of the original workers' cottages to renovate or develop.  Although predominantly middle class, the suburb still retains some of its working-class roots and like its neighbouring suburbs, is home to people from diverse cultural and ethnic backgrounds.

History
Popular belief has it that the area was once farmland and was named for the lilies that reportedly grew in the fields. However, its name origin remains unclear. Lilyfield was originally part of the suburb of Leichhardt.

The most dominant landmark in the area is the former Callan Park hospital. This was built on land acquired from the Callan Estates, a property between Balmain Road and Iron Cove. A psychiatric hospital was designed by James Barnet, the government architect, based on an asylum in Kent and utilising the principles of Dr Kirkbride, an American psychiatrist. Completed in 1884, the hospital was known until 1914 as the Callan Park Hospital for the Insane; the main part of the hospital, a cluster of sandstone buildings, was called the Kirkbride complex.

More recently, the Kirkbride complex became the home of the Sydney College of the Arts, and the hospital functions were confined to the western buildings. This is now known as Rozelle Hospital. The Kirkbride complex is listed on the Register of the National Estate.

After the construction of the City West Link Road in the 1990s, the suburb was effectively split into two parts. One half on the Rozelle side of the road, the other half on the Leichhardt side. This dramatic change in the geography did much to disrupt the sense of community in the relatively secluded suburb and almost led to its being subsumed into the neighbouring suburbs.

Orange Grove is a small locality within Lilyfield. Centred around Orange Grove Plaza, the locality shares its name with a primary school, market, and pub. The locality is served by the Inner West Light Rail.

Heritage listings 
Lilyfield has a number of heritage-listed sites, including:
 Balmain Road: Callan Park Hospital for the Insane
 Balmain Road: Broughton Hall
 Piper Street: White's Creek Aqueduct

Population

At the 2021 census the population of Lilyfield was 7,641.

According to the 2016 census of population, there were 7,616 people in Lilyfield.
 Aboriginal and Torres Strait Islander people made up 1.3% of the population. 
 67.5% of people were born in Australia. The next most common countries of birth were England 6.0% and New Zealand 2.8%.   
 77.3% of people spoke only English at home. Other languages spoken at home included Italian 3.7% and Greek 1.8%. 
 The most common responses for religion were No Religion 41.0% and Catholic 25.4%.
The 2011 census of population shows there were 7,342 people in Lilyfield, with a median age of 38. In the 2006 census there were 6,761 people in Lilyfield, while in the 2001 census gives a total population of 6,945.

Transport

Lilyfield station, in Catherine Street, is served by the Inner West Light Rail. The station opened in 2000, using a disused goods railway line from Central railway station. The stop was the western terminus of the light rail until 2014, when the line was extended along the route of another disused railway line to Dulwich Hill. Lilyfield was also the terminus of a tram line in the original Sydney tram system.

The 470 bus service runs from Lilyfield to the Sydney CBD via Glebe, Broadway and Elizabeth Street. The 370 service runs from Leichhardt to Coogee via King Street, Newtown. The 440 service runs from Rozelle to Bondi Junction via Leichhardt, Camperdown and Paddington. The 445 services run from Balmain to Campsie railway station, via Norton Street. Route 447 includes a diversion to serve the Lilyfield light rail station.

The City West Link is a major arterial road, which is part of the A4 and crosses the Anzac Bridge. It provides an alternative route to Parramatta Road for the Sydney CBD from Ashfield.

Bicycle routes in Lilyfield include part of the regional east-west route from Parramatta to the Sydney CBD, along Lilyfield Road, the Bay Run path around Iron Cove, and the Whites Creek path, which provides a north-south route from Parramatta Road to The Crescent at White Bay.

Parks and recreation
Leichhardt Park, which includes the Leichhardt Park Aquatic Centre was originally part of Leichhardt, as was Leichhardt Oval. the home of the Wests Tigers/Balmain Tigers

References

External links

  [CC-By-SA]

 
Suburbs of Sydney
Inner West Council